Liberty Belle may refer to:

Entertainment
Liberty Belle (film), a 1983 French film
"Liberty Belle" (song), a song by  Katastrophy Wife
"Liberty Belle" (Fontaines D.C. song), from their debut album, Dogrel
Liberty Belle and the Black Diamond Express, a 1986 music album by The Go-Betweens
Liberty Belle (comics), the name of three superheroes; two in DC Comics, one in Charlton Comics
Liberty Belle (GLOW), character in TV series

Other
Liberty Belle (aircraft), a former restored B-17 Flying Fortress, destroyed by an engine fire in June 2011
Liberty Belle, former name of a riverboat in the Gateway Clipper Fleet
Liberty Belle riverboat, a riverboat at Walt Disney World Resort  
USS Liberty Belle (IX-72), a 1910 experimental ship of the United States Navy during World War II
Philadelphia Liberty Belles, a football team of the Women's Football Alliance

See also
Liberty Bell (disambiguation)